State Route 177 (SR 177) is a secondary state highway in Shelby County, Tennessee.  The majority of the route is known as Germantown Road and Germantown Parkway.

Route description

SR 177 starts in southeast Memphis on Winchester Road near SR 385 (Bill Morris Parkway) with a speed limit of 40 MPH.  From there it runs north through the city of Germantown with a speed limit of 35 until it intersects with US 72/SR 57 where the speed limit rises to 40.  It then crosses the Wolf River where the speed limit rises to 45 and passes back into Memphis through the Cordova community. SR 177 later intersects I-40 (Exit 16) near the Wolfchase Galleria. SR 177 crosses US 64/SR 15 (Stage Road) in Bartlett, before terminating as a state route at US 70/US 79/SR 1. Germantown Road continues north until Old Brownsville Road near the Brunswick community.

Beginning at the US 72/SR 57 intersection, SR 177 turns from a two-lane road into a six-lane highway, and continues in this form through to its north terminus, and from the Wolf River bridge until the I-40 junction, the road is six-lane and has  paved outside shoulders on both sides, which only occasionally give way to a fourth lane or a right-turn lane. It also has a grassed median from the Wolf River to US 64. North of I-40 until US 64, the road has 4 lanes in each direction. North of US 64 until the route terminates, the road has 3 lanes in each direction.

History
Prior to 1990, SR 177 was two lanes throughout its length. After 1990, the route was expanded into its current form from US 72/SR 57 to the I-40 – US 64 area. In the late 1990s, it was expanded to its current form between US 64 to US 70/US 79. Germantown Parkway, as it is known locally, has seen significant commercial and residential development starting in the 1990s, including the establishment of restaurants, hotels, planned communities, and the Wolfchase Galleria.  North of US 64, however, little new development has taken place besides the addition of a few residential subdivisions, a school, and a Walgreens near US 70/US 79.

The speed limit between the Wolf River and I-40 was 50 miles per hour until 2014 when the city of Memphis lowered it to 45 MPH, possibly due to increasing traffic counts.

Future
Construction to widen a portion of SR 177 from Stout Road to Crestridge Road to 5 lanes has been completed. Also, the portion of SR 177 that overlaps Poplar Avenue was modified in 2013 to allow for two left turn lanes at both the Poplar/West St and Poplar/Germantown Pkwy intersections. This is to complement the new two left turn lanes at Germantown and Farmington.

Junction list

See also

References

177
Transportation in Memphis, Tennessee
Transportation in Shelby County, Tennessee
Bartlett, Tennessee
Germantown, Tennessee